Cottonwood Township is a township in Chase County, Kansas, United States.  As of the 2000 census, its population was 184.

Geography
The streams of Bruno Creek, Cedar Creek, Coon Creek, Coyne Branch, French Creek, Gould Creek, Holmes Creek and Silver Creek run through this township.

Communities
The township contains the following settlements:
 City of Cedar Point.
 Unincorporated community of Elmdale.

Cemeteries
The township contains the following cemeteries:
 Cedar Point.
 Drinkwater.
 Montgomery.

Further reading

References

External links
 Chase County Website
 City-Data.com
 Chase County Maps: Current, Historic, KDOT

Townships in Chase County, Kansas
Townships in Kansas